Jane Hicks Gentry (December 18, 1863 – May 25, 1925) was an Appalachian folklorist and singer, born in Watauga County, North Carolina.  She was known for her riddles and the "Jack, Will and Tom Tales", in addition to the songs she recorded for Cecil Sharp.  All were believed to have originated in England, Scotland or Germany, and passed down through Jane's family to her.

Background

She was the oldest of five children born to Emily Harmon and Ransom Hicks. Her brothers and sisters were John Riley, Mary, Margaret Elizabeth and William. The paternal Hicks lineage were emigrants from England who arrived in America prior to the American Revolutionary War. The Harmons in the maternal lineage came to America from Wurttemberg, Germany, also before the American Revolutionary War. When Emily was about 12 or 13 years old, they joined other families in moving to Madison County, on the Meadow Fork of Spring Creek, where they began to invest in farm acreage. As Emily worked inside their home, surrounded by the children, she sang songs and told stories and riddles that been passed along through the Harmon family. Jane had only a rudimentary education, but  learned the basics of reading in order to facilitate her reading of the Bible.  

Jane married Jasper Newton "Newt" Gentry in 1879, and the couple had nine children (Lydia Nora, Martha Emily, Mary Magdalene, Alfred Chanay, Allie Mae, Lillie Bertha Maud, Roy Stevens, Lalla Marvin, Nola Jane). Their youngest child was born after they moved to Hot Springs. There they bought acreage on which they raised livestock and farm produce. The Gentry children were enrolled in the Presbyterian-run Dorland Institute, their tuition paid through income from a grocery store run by Newt, where he sold produce grown on their land.  Jane earned money by working at the school. Over the years, she supervised students who also worked at the school. Jane became part of the school's culture by continuing to tell her stories, sing a little and dance for the students and faculty.

Eventually Jane ran a boarding house that welcomed students and faculty of the school.  A friend of the family remembered, "She wove, spun, tatted, knit, crocheted, and she was always teaching other people to do these things. And she would sing and tell stories while we worked.  It seemed natural for her to sing and tell stories." The United States government turned Mountain Park Hotel at Hot Springs into a World War I prisoner-of-war internment camp for German sailors. Families of the prisoners lived in town, some at Jane's boarding house.

Songs and stories

English folk song collector Cecil Sharp and his colleague Maud  Karpeles were invited to Appalachia by American folklorist Olive Dame Campbell in 1916 to seek out old songs and ballads, especially those that had travelled from the British Isles. It was Dorland principal Lucy 
Shafer who suggested they meet Jane Gentry. From August 24, 1916 until July 27, 1917, Sharp and Karpeles made several visits to notate Jane's songs, obtaining a total of 70 from her. Sharp did not comment specifically on the likely origin of her songs, but believed that in general the older Appalachian ballads came from England or Lowland Scotland. Holgar Nygard, Professor Emeritus of English at Duke University, suggested that Scotland was the more likely source for many of the songs in Jane's repertoire, but Brian Peters, in a detailed study of Sharp's Appalachian collection, showed that ballads such as "Barbara Allen", "Little Musgrave" and "Lord Thomas and Fair Ellender" most likely originated in England.

Jane referred to her stories as "Jack, Will and Tom Tales". Musician and historian Betty N. Smith compared the structure of the tales to German Märchen fairy tales, but speculated that they may have originated with the Hick's English ancestors. Author Irving Bacheller and his wife Anna first met Jane at her boarding house in 1914, telling stories and riddles to delighted children.  The Bachellers were so impressed with Jane that they invited her to visit them in Greenwich, Connecticut. According to Betty N. Smith's research,  the visit was incorporated into Bacheller's novel Tower of a Hundred Bells, destroyed by a house fire in 1917, a fact confirmed after Jane's death, in a letter from Bacheller to her daughter Maud Long, "I wrote a book largely about your mother and her mountain life which was destroyed by a fire that burned my home in 1917."

Fifteen stories of Jane's were contained within twenty-three stories total published by Isabel Gordon Carter in The Journal of American Folklore in 1925. The other stories in the published work were six by Susie Wilkenson of Sevier County, Tennessee, and two stories by John Campbell of Townsend, Tennessee. As noted by Carter, folklorists of the time had primarily collected songs and overlooked the stories.  When Jane was asked to tell the tales for this work, she confirmed in part that the stories had been passed down in the family, from her great-grandmother passing them down to Jane's grandfather Council Harmon. 

Jane's daughter Maud Long later recorded some of the stories for the Archive of American Folk Song at the Library of Congress.

Death
Newt Gentry died March 24, 1922.

Jane died in May 1925. Her obituary noted her knowledge of old English and Scottish folksongs.

Bibliography

References

External links

1863 births
1925 deaths
American folklorists
Women folklorists
History of North Carolina
People from Madison County, North Carolina
People from Watauga County, North Carolina
American people of English descent
American people of German descent